George Woodbourne Hoskins (25 September 1928 – 23 January 2000) was a New Zealand runner, who competed at the 1952 Olympics in the 1500 m and 5000 m. He won his 1500 m heat, but finished last in his semi-final. He failed to finish his 5000 m heat. At the national level, Hoskins won the under-19 2 miles and under-19 cross-country titles in 1947, the 3 miles championships in 1950, 1951 and 1952, and the 880 yards title in 1953.

References

1928 births
2000 deaths
Athletes from Lower Hutt
New Zealand male middle-distance runners
Olympic athletes of New Zealand
Athletes (track and field) at the 1952 Summer Olympics
New Zealand male cross country runners
Athletes (track and field) at the 1950 British Empire Games
Commonwealth Games competitors for New Zealand